The 1854 Grand National was the 16th renewal of the Grand National horse race that took place at Aintree near Liverpool, England, on 1 March 1854.

Finishing Order

Non-finishers

References

 1854
Grand National
Grand National
19th century in Lancashire
February 1854 sports events